The Serbu Super-Shorty is a compact, stockless, pump action shotgun chambered in 12-gauge (2¾ and 3"). The basic architecture of most of the production models is based on the Mossberg Maverick 88 shotgun, with Mossberg 500 and Remington 870 receivers also available. The shotgun features a spring-loaded, folding foregrip. A 20-gauge model is available on special order.

In the United States, the Super-Shorty is classified as an Any Other Weapon (AOW). Civilian ownership transfers of the shotgun require a $5 tax stamp and registration as an AOW to be in compliance with the National Firearms Act. As the weapon is originally manufactured without a shoulder stock, it is considered a smooth-bore handgun, and thus an AOW, rather than a short-barrelled shotgun. The Super-Shorty has been sold to various foreign customers, including the King of Jordan, Abdullah II.

Serbu Firearms announced on its social media pages on June 7, 2022 that the Super-Shorty was officially discontinued due to it taking up too many resources from their main product lines for .50 caliber rifles.

Users
 , various law enforcement agencies and the military.

See also
 Norinco HP9-1

References

External links
 Official Site
 SBSReview.Net:  Super-Shorty Review & Videos

Pump-action shotguns
Shotguns of the United States